Anthracophora crucifera, commonly known as Bark beetle, is a species of dung beetle found in India, and Sri Lanka.

Biology
Grubs usually feed on the decaying organic matter, both plant and animal. Adults feed on the floral parts of many commercially important crops such as Curcuma aromatica, Sorghum bicolor, Pennisetum glaucum, Abelmoschus esculentus.and Zea mays. Adults emerge with theonset of flowering season of the crops, during August to September.

References 

Scarabaeidae
Insects of Sri Lanka
Insects of India
Insects described in 1789